Ian Darke (born 1950) is an English association football and boxing commentator who currently works for ESPN and BT Sport. Darke was previously one of Sky's "Big Four" football commentators alongside Martin Tyler, Alan Parry and Rob Hawthorne. He was also the main commentator for Sky's big boxing fights and along with Jim Watt, covered some of the biggest fights involving British boxers.

Career

BBC Radio/Sky Sports
Darke worked for nearly ten years on BBC Radio covering boxing, athletics and football, before moving to Sky Sports in 1992 to commentate on the newly formed FA Premier League. He was the number two to lead commentator Martin Tyler and was the main commentator for Ford Monday Night Football.

In 1995, as Sky's boxing coverage expanded so much that the sport almost disappeared from terrestrial screens, Darke switched permanently to be their main boxing commentator, his role on Monday Night Football being taken by Rob Hawthorne. He was one of the Sky commentators for Evander Holyfield vs. Mike Tyson II, the fight known for being the one where Tyson bit off a piece of Holyfield's ear.

Nearly ten years later, after boxing promoter Frank Warren took his fighters to ITV, Sky's boxing output was significantly reduced, freeing up Darke for a return to 'live' football (although he had commentated on matches for an international audience, and had been heard on Sky covering some Champions League matches). Darke commentated on matches such as the 2005 Champions League semi-final between Chelsea and Liverpool.

Darke enjoyed a prolific Sky Sports career with commentaries for Premier League, UEFA Champions League and Football League matches, as well as maintaining his boxing commitments.

ESPN

In 2010, Sky did not receive rights to the 2010 FIFA World Cup, and Darke was hired to be an ESPN commentator for their coverage of the World Cup for the American market, and he became known to the American public as the English-language commentator for Landon Donovan's last-second goal for the United States against Algeria that allowed the USA to not only advance to the knockout stage, but also win their group.

Despite beginning the 2010–11 Premier League season with Sky in the UK, Darke was offered a three-year contract to join ESPN in the U.S. as their voice of the Premier League. He accepted the offer. Darke later expanded his duties to commentate on MLS games, the 2013 FIFA Confederations Cup and the 2014 FIFA World Cup, where he was their lead commentator and called the final.

Darke paired with Julie Foudy to lead ESPN's coverage of the 2011 FIFA Women's World Cup and commentated another American tournament-saving goal – Abby Wambach's last-second header against Brazil in the quarterfinals – before teaming with Taylor Twellman (for Team USA's games) and Steve McManaman (for other games, including those featuring England and the final between Germany and Argentina) during the 2014 World Cup.

Darke returned to ESPN more permanently as the lead La Liga commentator alongside his long time broadcast partner Steve McManaman.

For the 2022 World Cup, ESPN loaned Darke to Fox Sports. 

The fact that Darke has commentated enthusiastically for MLS and for both the US Men's and Women's National Teams has led The American Outlaws to create a chant named "Ian Darke, you are a Yank" and the Men in Blazers (Michael Davies and Roger Bennett) to name him "Sir Ian Darke".

BT Sport
At the start of the 2013–14 Premier League season, Darke joined the BT Sport team as a commentator for English Premier League matches. He can also be heard on the Premier League world feed. He commentated on the 2014, 2016, 2017 and 2019 FA Cup Final.

Darke said on the Men in Blazers podcast on Grantland.com that one of the worst places to commentate from was Port Vale F.C. He recalled calling a game at Vale Park during a rain storm from the roof of the stand. Darke equated the experience to "being on the deck of a ship in the middle of the Atlantic."

Darke was part of a team of commentators for Prime Video's UK Premier League coverage. He paired with his ESPN colleague Craig Burley.

Fox Sports
Darke announced on Twitter on July 26, 2022 that he would be joining Fox Sports' slate of broadcasters for the 2022 FIFA World Cup in a supporting role, comparing his stint to a loan from ESPN.

Notes

References

External links

 Ian Darke – BT Sport
 Ian Darke: 'Commentating is a 90-minute ad-lib'

1954 births
Living people
English association football commentators
English sports broadcasters
Mass media people from Portsmouth
Place of birth missing (living people)
Association football commentators
Boxing commentators
Major League Soccer broadcasters